The Lithuanian Men's Curling Championship is the national championship of men's curling in Lithuania. It has been held annually since 2006 and organized by the Lithuanian Curling Association.

Championship is held in conjunction with Lithuanian Women's Curling Championship.

In 2013 championship was "absolute" - for men's, women's and mixed teams.

List of champions
Teams line-up in order: fourth, third, second, lead, alternate, coach; skips marked in bold.

References

See also
Lithuanian Women's Curling Championship